Artyom Nikolaevich Bystrov (born March 19, 1985) is a Russian actor. He appeared in 40 films. Winner of the Leopard for Best Actor on Locarno Festival (2014).

Biography
Bystrov was born in Gorky, Russian SFSR, Soviet Union (now Nizhny Novgorod, Russia). He studied at the Nizhny Novgorod Theater School, after which he moved to Moscow, where he entered the Moscow Art Theatre School, and after graduation he was accepted into the troupe of the Moscow Art Theater named after A.P. Chekhov.

Selected filmography

References

External links
 Artyom Bystrov on kino-teatr.ru

1985 births
Actors from Nizhny Novgorod
Russian male film actors
Russian male television actors
Russian male stage actors
21st-century Russian male actors
Living people